Nora la rebelde (in English "Nora the Rebel") is a 1979 Mexican comedy film directed by Mauricio de la Serna and starring Olga Breeskin and Andrés García.

Plot
Nora is a beautiful music student who wants to be a violinist like her late father, but finds out that people focus more on her stunning good looks than her talent, much to her chagrin. When she finds out that the virtuous Bulgarian orchestra director Sándor Horváth is coming to Mexico, she will do the impossible to meet him in person, and on the way, she will be involved in a hilarious series of accidents caused by her looks. In the meantime, a neighbor of hers, the dentist Gerardo, will try to confess to her a couple of things that will end up making her reflect on life and love.

Cast
 Olga Breeskin as Nora Pérez
 Andrés García as Dr. Gerardo	
 Amparo Arozamena as Beatriz viuda de Pérez
 Alejandro Ciangherotti
 
  as Television actor
  as Wife of Melitón Cabadas
 Sergio Guzik as Eduardo, Nora's suitor
  as Nora's classmate at music school (uncredited)
 José Roberto Hill as Young man in public phone line (uncredited)

Production
Released on 1979, the film meant the return of Mauricio de la Serna as director after 15 years of retirement, after the failure of his previous film Furia en el Edén (1964); when consulted in an interview about his long absence from the world of cinema, he declared that he did it "because the pornography and churrismo [referring to churro, a term used for a low-budget film] were bursting me", alluding to the Mexican sex comedy genre then prevailing in the film industry of Mexico.

Originally the film went under the working title Todos queremos ver a Nora ("We all want to see Nora"), paraphrasing the song "Todos queremos ver a Olga", with which star Olga Breeskin opened her vedette shows.

Reception
The film was subject of a negative review by Paco Ignacio Taibo I, who in a review for Proceso magazine titled El asesinato de un proyecto de estrella ("The murder of a star project"), summed up his views on the film saying, "I think that direction does not exist in Nora la rebelde, and that there is no criterion of elemental sanity either; everything is vulgar and outdated, without style and without grace."

References

External links
 

1979 films
1970s Spanish-language films
1979 comedy films
Mexican comedy films
Films about classical music and musicians
1970s Mexican films